Addaura is a seaside village or Frazione of Palermo, Italy included in the VII District. It resides on the Lungomare Cristoforo Colombo, which starts from the south-east border of Mondello and reaches Palermo bypassing Monte Pellegrino.

The locality has a strong historical and naturalistic interest due to the presence of the Addaura Cave, one of the largest archaeological heritages in Sicily and a place of exceptional importance for the study of prehistoric art: it is one of the few sites that preserves engravings of Paleolithic communities. It is part of the "Places of the Heart" list of the Italian Environment Fund.

Geography

Territory 
Addaura rises on the north-western coast of the Sicilian capital, at the foot of the northern slope of Monte Pellegrino. It looks like a narrow strip of land, enclosed between a low cliff bathed by the waters of the Tyrrhenian Sea and the steep walls of the mountain, however accessible by means of some passes that appear to have been used since prehistoric times. It separates the Gulf of Mondello to the east and unlike the latter, which has a beach with a conformation similar to the Caribbean ones, it is characterized by a rocky promenade full of inlets, with a sandy bottom.

In the massive cliff of Monte Pellegrino, which overlooks the entire district, there are several cavities originating from marine erosion and which constitute a heritage of extreme naturalistic and historical importance due to the exceptional findings of a paleontological and palethnological nature. Of this cave complex, the subject of research since the second half of the nineteenth century, there are four so-called main caves, which from east to west are: the Grotta Perciata (or Grotta Addaura Grande), the Grotta Caprara, the Grotta dei Bovidi (or dell'Antro Nero) and the Cave of Engravings. [7] Some of them (the Perciata and the Caprara) present internal karst phenomena that have created tunnels long for hundreds of meters, therefore they are equipped with articulated internal developments and are distinguished by their speleological importance [8].

There is also a thick pine forest that laps this coastal stretch with its green.

Origin of the name 
The oldest document in which the name of the locality appears is a declaratio by Charles I of Anjou of 20 August 1270, in which the territory is referred to with the ancient name of Daura, designating it as a hunting area reserved for the Royal Curia. [9]. As suggested by the studies of the historian Rosario La Duca, based on the Evagrii Historia ecclesiastica by Henricus Valesius, published in 1673, the term daura may be a corruption of the Greek word laura, which indicates a community of religious who led a solitary life in groups of cells formed by small huts or caves, separated from each other [10]. The discovery of ceramic fragments from the Middle Ages and the Renaissance in numerous caves and small cavities of the rocky front at the foot of which the hamlet stands, confirm that this locality has hosted communities of hermits in the past: for this reason, it is extremely probable that the toponym Daura refer to the monastic order widespread when the area was still a fiefdom owned by the Palermo church and which does not derive from laurus (Laurus nobilis, laurel plant) as suggested by some scholars [11]. In a notarial deed of the end of the sixteenth century, the former feud or estate is, in fact, called Alaura, later transformed into Allaura and finally Sicilianized into Addaura [10].

History

Prehistory 
The first evidence of human settlements in the Addaura area dates back to the Paleolithic, when several prehistoric tribes colonized the caves of Monte Pellegrino. In this complex of cavities in the calcarenite, together with the caves of Monte Gallo - near today's Mondello - the first men to live in the Conca d'Oro found refuge. It was a society without hierarchy and whose existence was initially linked to the hunting and slaughtering of captured prey. Some of these caves were used both as a dwelling and as a burial place, with burials carried out in pits dug into the earth and often bordered by stones: the deceased was buried with a poor set of ornamental objects, mostly pierced shells and animal teeth [12].

The progressive environmental change, characterized by an increase in the average terrestrial temperature, led to a different development of flora and fauna, as well as to a rise in sea level with the consequent thinning of the emerged lands. In the Mesolithic the mammal hunters who lived in the Addaura caves adapted to the new environment with a slow technological evolution, learning to cultivate the land and to take control over some animal species. The set of caves of Monte Pellegrino, enlarged by the abrasive action of the water, returned to be occupied and exploited mostly in the winter period for fishing and collecting terrestrial and marine molluscs, while hunting was practiced in the inland during the summer. The artistic representations, many of a religious nature, discovered in the Grotta delle Incisioni and in the Grotta dell'Antro Nero, probably used as a place of worship, can be traced back to this historical phase.

Origin and development of the village
From historical evidence it appears that around the 13th century the territory was a fief of the Church and that the caves were used as a place of spiritual retreat by the hermit monks.

The first group of houses came after the construction of the port of Addaura in the sixteenth century, with which an economy linked to fishing and maritime trade began. This period coincides with the phenomenon of the attacks by the Barbary pirates against the flourishing entrepreneurship born on the north-western coast of Sicily, which lasted until the eighteenth century. After a series of dramatic attacks, of which the 1580 raid at the Passo di lo Dauro is remembered in Addaura, the Palermitan Senate responded with the construction of a network of watchtowers which had the task of tracking down the pirate boats in time. and organize the defense of communities and districts. On the border between the Addaura and the hamlet of Vergine Maria, the Torre del Rotolo was built, one of the first to be designed and therefore less refined than more recent examples: for this reason it was intended for "short distance" sightings [13].

The nineteenth and twentieth centuries 
In the second half of the 19th century some researches led to the discovery of important paleontological and palethnological finds in the Addaura Caprara cave. The event met with considerable success in the international scientific panorama and gave rise to a lasting campaign of excavations and explorations that quickly extended to the nearby promontories [1].

In 1918, the Lloyd Adriatico Meridionale group built a shipyard for the construction of wooden boats in the coastal strip protected by the rocky ridge. But, after the Rome shipping company took over, the construction and plant program underwent important changes, in order to be destined for the construction of medium and large tonnage metal ships. The Company built a dock with landing docks and a dry dock, plus a work area consisting of four slipways, a power station, a foundry and several workshops. The shipyard was called Rome and remained active until the 1930s, when the company that managed it went bankrupt as it was registered in the Banca di Discount, subject to a heavy financial meltdown.

After the Second World War, the buildings of the shipyard were modified and used as the headquarters of the Roosevelt Institute, a colony for Sicilian war orphans built with the financial support of the United States federal government [14] and inaugurated in 1948 by the then vice president of the Council of Ministers, Giuseppe Saragat. The institute was later entrusted to the vocation fathers who provided to found a parish church within the area, still active [15].

Archaeological investigations in the area were also resumed in 1946, with two short excavation campaigns conducted by researchers Luigi Bernabò Brea and Jole Bovio Marconi in the area in front of the Addaura II Grotto. The presence on the site of a military arsenal of the German army, including some unexploded ordnance, made it impossible to explore the entire cave: its explosion a few years later, accidental according to some or controlled by the allied military authorities according to another version, damaged a large portion of the mountain but also had the effect of allowing the discovery of the Grotta delle Incisioni. Thus, just two years after the discovery of the Cala Genovese cave on the island of Levanzo, Sicily returned to the center of the international debate on rock art for the reporting, in December 1954, of a new natural cavity with evidence of wall representations to Addaura. [16]

On June 21, 1989, an attack on Judge Giovanni Falcone by the Cosa Nostra was foiled in the hamlet: some bombs hidden at the foot of the Judge's villa in Addaura were discovered before they were triggered. This event remained known as the Addaura attack. Giovanni Falcone, after this failed attack, died three years later in the Capaci massacre which took place on May 23, 1992.

Contemporary era 
The Addaura is today a purely residential hamlet, with a strong tourist attraction especially during the summer season.

In addition to the parish, the Roosevelt Institute hosts the Superintendence for the Cultural and Environmental Heritage of the Sea: however, most of the buildings located within its perimeter are not exploited and since 2017 some associations have been negotiating with the Sicilian Region and the Municipality of Palermo for the redevelopment of the site, through the creation of an urban park overlooking the gulf where various realities dedicated to scientific research and tourism would settle [17]. In December 2019, the regional government announced the start of work to transform the former Roosevelt into an international research center of the Sicilian Region for the environment and health [18].

Economy 
The economy has always been linked to fishing, practiced with ancient methods, and has always been subsistence. Over time, the caves have become an important tourist destination for those coming on holiday to the Province of Palermo. The marina and the coast have instead determined a seaside tourism. The area is also popular for landscape hikes.

Infrastructure and transport

Streets
The state road 113 Northern Sicula, which runs along the Lungomare Cristoforo Colombo, connects the Addaura to the urban center of Palermo in a southerly direction, bypassing the mountain and passing the Arenella-Vergine Maria district to reach the Montepellegrino district; while towards the north it allows you to reach Mondello.

Urban mobility
Two urban bus lines managed by the municipal company AMAT connect the Addaura to the public transport network of the city of Palermo: the day line 603 (Stadium - Mondello) and the night line N1 (Piazza Indipendenza - Mondello Torre).

References

Related items
Grotta dell'Addaura
Monte Pellegrino
Attack of the Addaura
Mondello

Palermo